Richard Dalby (died before 1455) was an English property owner, Member of Parliament and probably a trader.

Born in Gloucester, Dalby was a Member (MP) of the Parliament of England for Gloucester December 1421 to 1435.

References

Year of birth missing
Year of death missing
15th-century English people
People from Gloucester
Members of the Parliament of England (pre-1707) for Gloucester